Marojejya is a genus of flowering plant in the family Arecaceae. It contains the following two species, both endemic to Madagascar:

 Marojejya darianii J.Dransf. & N.W.Uhl
 Marojejya insignis Humbert

References

 
Endemic flora of Madagascar
Arecaceae genera
Taxonomy articles created by Polbot